Diplatys is a genus of Asian earwigs, in the family Diplatyidae, erected by Jean Guillaume Audinet-Serville in 1831.  The recorded distribution of species is from Indochina, although this may be incomplete; it is also worth noting that other genera in subfamily Diplatyinae and the genus Haplodiplatys historically have been placed here.

Species
The Dermaptera Species File lists:
subgenus Diplatys Audinet-Serville, 1831

 Diplatys baijali Duda & Malhotra, 1970
 Diplatys beroni Brindle, 1982
 Diplatys coerulescens Brindle, 1979
 Diplatys croixi Burr, 1904
 Diplatys degerboliae Ramamurthi, 1973
 Diplatys dohrni Burr, 1911
 Diplatys fella Burr, 1911
 Diplatys flavobrunneus Chopard, 1924
 Diplatys hakasonei Nishikawa, 1973
 Diplatys hayashidai Nishikawa, 1973
 Diplatys himalayanus Baijal & Singh, 1954
 Diplatys jawalagiriensis Kapoor, Bharadwaj & Banerjee, 1971
 Diplatys leleupi Brindle, 1966
 Diplatys macrocephalus (Palisot de Beauvois, 1805) - type species  (as Forficula macrocephala Palisot de Beauvois)
 Diplatys menoni Kapoor & Bharadwaj, 1968
 Diplatys nathani Hincks, 1960
 Diplatys raffrayi Dubrony, 1879
 Diplatys rehni Hincks, 1955
 Diplatys ridleyi Kirby, 1903
 Diplatys saxeus Brindle, 1982
 Diplatys shirakii Nishikawa, 1973
 Diplatys taurinus Brindle, 1982
 Diplatys torrevillasi Srivastava, 1976
 Diplatys ugandanus Hincks, 1955
 Diplatys vittatus Bey-Bienko, 1970

subgenus Hypodiplatys Steinmann, 1986
 Diplatys podiplatys Steinmann, 1986
 Diplatys bormansi Burr, 1910
 Diplatys denticulatus Hincks, 1957
 Diplatys deviensis Srivastava, 1974
 Diplatys fletcheri Burr, 1910
 Diplatys javanicus Hincks, 1955
subgenus Neodiplatys’ Steinmann, 1986

synonym Verhoeffiella Zacher, 1910
 Diplatys aethiops Burr, 1904
 Diplatys annandalei Burr, 1911
 Diplatys borellii Hincks, 1955
 Diplatys brindlei Steinmann, 1974
 Diplatys chopardi Hincks, 1955
 Diplatys dolens Hincks, 1957
 Diplatys excidens Hincks, 1954
 Diplatys gedyei Hincks, 1955
 Diplatys lefroyi Burr, 1910
 Diplatys longipennis Brindle, 1969
 Diplatys pictus (Zacher, 1911)
 Diplatys poonaensis Kapoor, 1968
 Diplatys popovi Bey-Bienko, 1959
 Diplatys simplex Hincks, 1961

subgenus Syndiplatys Steinmann, 1986

 Diplatys adjacens Hincks, 1955
 Diplatys anamalaiensis Srivastava, 1969
 Diplatys coelebs Hincks, 1955
 Diplatys confusus Hincks, 1955
 Diplatys ernesti Burr, 1910
 Diplatys fallax Borelli, 1926
 Diplatys flavicollis Shiraki, 1907
 Diplatys greeni Burr, 1904
 Diplatys griffithsi Burr, 1911
 Diplatys incisus Brindle, 1975
 Diplatys jacobsoni Burr, 1911
 Diplatys jogiensis Kapoor, 1968
 Diplatys liberatus Burr, 1910
 Diplatys nilgiriensis Hincks, 1955
 Diplatys propinquus Hincks, 1955
 Diplatys reconditus Hincks, 1955
 Diplatys santoshi Srivastava, 1975
 Diplatys singularis Steinmann, 1986
 Diplatys sinuatus Hincks, 1955
 Diplatys truncatus Hincks, 1947
 Diplatys yunnaneus Bey-Bienko, 1959incertae sedis Diplatys kabakovi Anisyutkin, 1997
 Diplatys mutiara Kamimura & Nishikawa, 2016
 Diplatys sakaii'' Gorokhov & Anisyutkin, 1994

References

External Links
Images at iNaturalist

Dermaptera genera
Earwigs
Insects of Asia